Chang Han (born December 25, 1985, in Hualien) is a Taiwanese football player from Amis tribe. He usually plays as a striker. During the 2008 Summer Olympics qualifications, he was usually in the starting line-up in Chinese Taipei's 4–4–2 with Huang Wei-yi. In the 2010 East Asian Football Championship, with teammate Chan Che-yuan's assist, he headed Chinese Taipei's first goal against North Korea in the history.

Chang currently serves military service.

International goals 

 Scores and results table. Chinese Taipei's goal tally first:

Career statistics

References

External links 
 

1985 births
Living people
Taiwanese footballers
Chinese Taipei international footballers
People from Hualien County
Amis people
Taiwanese men's futsal players
Tatung F.C. players
Association football forwards